The 1981 CCHA Men's Ice Hockey Tournament was the tenth CCHA Men's Ice Hockey Tournament. It was played between March 6 and March 14, 1981. All games were played at Lakeview Arena in Marquette, Michigan, the home venue of the Northern Michigan Wildcats. By winning the tournament, Northern Michigan received the Central Collegiate Hockey Association's automatic bid to the 1981 NCAA Division I Men's Ice Hockey Tournament, the first automatic bid for the conference.

Format
The tournament featured two rounds of play. Only the top four teams in the conference standings were eligible for postseason play. Each of the two rounds were structured so that the two teams facing one another would play two games and the winner would be decided by the goal differential totals of the combined scores. In the semifinal the first and fourth seeds and the second and third seeds were matched as opponents. The victorious teams would then compete in the finals for the conference championship. The tournament champion receives an automatic bid to the 1981 NCAA Division I Men's Ice Hockey Tournament.

Conference standings
Note: GP = Games played; W = Wins; L = Losses; T = Ties; PTS = Points; GF = Goals For; GA = Goals Against

Bracket

Note: * denotes overtime period(s)

Semifinals

(1) Northern Michigan vs. (4) Bowling Green

(2) Ohio State vs. (3) Ferris State

Championship

(1) Northern Michigan vs. (2) Ohio State

Tournament awards

MVP
None

References

External links
CCHA Champions
1980–81 CCHA Standings
1980–81 NCAA Standings

CCHA Men's Ice Hockey Tournament
Ccha tournament